What Ifs? of American History, subtitled Eminent Historians Imagine What Might Have Been, is a collection of seventeen essays dealing with counterfactual history regarding the United States. It was published by G.P. Putnam's Sons in 2003, and this book as well as its two predecessors, What If? and What If? 2, were edited by Robert Cowley.

Essays

"Might the Mayflower Not Have Sailed?" by Theodore K. Rabb 
What if the Mayflower had not set sail from England in 1620?
"William Pitt the Elder and the Avoidance of the American Revolution" by Caleb Carr
What if Parliament had pursued a more conciliatory policy regarding the Thirteen Colonies' war debts?
"What the Fog Wrought: The Revolution's Dunkirk, August 29, 1776" by David McCullough
What if George Washington's retreat after the Battle of Long Island had not succeeded?  (This essay is a reprint from What If?)
"'His Accidency' John Tyler" by Tom Wicker
What if the tenth President of the United States had not assumed the full power of the presidency after the death of his predecessor, William Henry Harrison?
"Lew Wallace and the Ghosts of the Shunpike" by Victor Davis Hanson
What if General Wallace's reinforcement of General Grant at the Battle of Shiloh had been successful?
"If the Lost Order Hadn't Been Lost: Robert E. Lee Humbles the Union, 1862" by James M. McPherson
What if Lee had succeeded in destroying the Army of the Potomac?  (This essay is a reprint from What If?)
"The Northwest Conspiracy" by Thomas Fleming
What if the Copperheads in Illinois, Indiana, Kentucky, and Ohio had succeeded in inciting protest against the Lincoln administration?
"Beyond the Wildest Dreams of John Wilkes Booth" by Jay Winik
What if Booth's co-conspirators had succeeded in assassinating Johnson and Seward?
"The Revolution of 1877" by Cecelia Holland
What if the Great Railroad Strike of 1877 had turned into a full-blown worker's uprising?
"The Whale Against the Wolf: The Anglo-American War of 1896" by Andrew Roberts
What if the United Kingdom and the United States went to war over the border dispute between Venezuela and British Guiana?
"No Pearl Harbor?  FDR Delays the War" by John Lukacs
What if Japan had not attacked Pearl Harbor?
"If Eisenhower Had Gone to Berlin" by Antony Beevor
What if the Allied armies had not stopped at the Elbe?
"Joe McCarthy's Secret Life" by Ted Morgan
What if Senator McCarthy had done more damage than he did?
"If the U-2 Hadn't Flown" by George Feifer
What if there had been no U-2 flight on May 1, 1960?
"The Cuban Missile Crisis: Second Holocaust" by Robert L. O'Connell
What if the Crisis had spiraled into World War III?
"JFK Lives" by Robert Dallek
What if President Kennedy had not been assassinated in 1963?
"What if Watergate Were Still Just an Upscale Address?" by Lawrence Malkin and John F. Stacks
What if the Watergate break-in had not been discovered?

Reviews
"Great for history buffs not quite ready for fiction, it is suitable for public libraries and general academic collections."—Library Journal.
"In this interesting book, the latest in a series using the same gimmick, experts speculate on how things might have worked out differently if some pivotal historical event had not happened." —New York Times.

See also
What If? (essays)
What If? 2

References

2003 non-fiction books
Alternate history anthologies
American non-fiction books
Essay anthologies
G. P. Putnam's Sons books
History books about the United States
American Civil War alternate histories
World War II alternate histories
Cultural depictions of John Wilkes Booth
Cultural depictions of Dwight D. Eisenhower
Cultural depictions of Andrew Johnson
Cultural depictions of Lyndon B. Johnson
Cultural depictions of John F. Kennedy
Cultural depictions of Robert E. Lee
Cultural depictions of Joseph McCarthy
Cultural depictions of Richard Nixon
Cultural depictions of Franklin D. Roosevelt
Cultural depictions of George Washington
2003 anthologies